Show Me Your Tears is the sixth and final studio album to be released to date by Frank Black and the Catholics. Released in September 2003 by SpinART in the US and Cooking Vinyl in the UK, the album employs a wide range of guests, including piano and an arrangement by Van Dyke Parks on the final track, "Manitoba". Within months of the album's release, it was announced that Black would be participating in a Pixies reunion, and since that time, the Catholics have effectively been defunct.

Recording
Black said, "We’d been playing together a long time, ten years of hard touring and loading our own gear and not making a lotta money out of it, and we’re hittin’ the mid-life crisis. And they’re all getting mad at me ‘cause I’m forcing them to record live to two-track for the umpteenth time."

Track listing
All tracks written by Frank Black.
"Nadine" – 3:05
"Everything Is New" – 3:51
"My Favorite Kiss" – 2:06
"Jaina Blues" – 3:51
"New House of the Pope" – 3:15
"Horrible Day" – 3:37
"Massif Centrale" – 4:52
"When Will Happiness Find Me Again?" – 2:19
"Goodbye Lorraine" – 2:37
"This Old Heartache" – 3:27
"The Snake" – 2:01
"Coastline" – 1:57
"Manitoba" – 4:33

Personnel
Credits adapted from the album's liner notes.

Frank Black and the Catholics
 Frank Black – vocals, guitar
 Scott Boutier – drums, bells
 Rich Gilbert – guitar, piano, pedal steel guitar, vocals
 David McCaffrey – bass, vocals
 David Philips – guitar, pedal steel guitar, vocals

Additional musicians
Joey Santiago – guitar
Keith Moliné – guitar
Stan Ridgway – harmonica, melodica, banjo, percussion, vocals
Eric Drew Feldman – organ
Van Dyke Parks – piano, accordion
Rob Laufer – piano, vocals
Jack Kidney – saxophone, harmonica
Andy J. Perkins – trumpet
Cynthia Haagens – vocals 
Eric Potter – vocals
Jean Black – vocals
Pietra Wexstun – vocals

Technical
Nick Vincent – producer (tracks 1, 2, 5–8, 11)
Stan Ridgway – producer (tracks 3, 9, 10, 12, 13), cover and booklet photos 
Ben Mumphrey – producer (track 4), engineer
Frank Black and the Catholics – producer (track 4)
Miles Wilson – assistant engineer 
Paul Figueroa – assistant engineer  
Phillip Broussard – assistant engineer 
Eddy Schreyer – mastering
Jean Black – cover design
Mark Husmann – band photos

References

Frank Black and the Catholics albums
SpinART Records albums
2003 albums
Cooking Vinyl albums